Melbourne Watch Company is an Australian manufacturer of watches. It was founded in Melbourne in 2013.

References

External links

Manufacturing companies based in Melbourne
Privately held companies of Australia
Australian brands
Australian companies established in 2013
Manufacturing companies established in 2013
Watch manufacturing companies
Clock manufacturing companies of Australia
Watch manufacturing companies of Australia
Watch brands